Hans Plenk (born 21 February 1938) was a West German luger who competed during the 1960s.

He was born in Berchtesgaden.

He won the bronze medal in the men's singles event at the 1964 Winter Olympics in Innsbruck.

Plenk won five medals at the FIL World Luge Championships with four medals in the men's singles (gold: 1965, silver: 1961, 1963; bronze: 1960) and one in the men's doubles event (bronze: 1960).

References
 
 
 

1938 births
Living people
German male lugers
Olympic lugers of the United Team of Germany
Olympic lugers of West Germany
Olympic bronze medalists for the United Team of Germany
Olympic medalists in luge
Lugers at the 1964 Winter Olympics
Lugers at the 1968 Winter Olympics
Medalists at the 1964 Winter Olympics
People from Berchtesgaden
Sportspeople from Upper Bavaria
20th-century German people